Pakhangba is a primordial deity, often represented in the form of a dragon, in Meitei mythology and religion. He is depicted in the heraldry of Manipur kingdom, which originated in paphal, the mythical illustrations of the deity belonging to the traditional beliefs of Sanamahism in Manipur. Among the Meiteis, it is believed that the ancestor of one of the clans manifested himself as the Pakhangba.

The identity of the deity is often fused with Nongda Lairen Pakhangba, the first ruler of the Ningthouja dynasty. The title Pakhangba was also used by other kings in the history of Manipur.

In heraldry
A Pakhangba as a heraldic dragon was present in all the former royal flags and coats of arms of Manipur. 
The kingdom of Manipur had a set of two flags, a white one and a red one. All featured the Pakhangba dragon in the centre, although not as prominently in the latter flags.

Description

The Pakhangba is the supreme God. He is a man who can change his body to any form, like animals, and others as he is a powerful God. In certain sculptures, known as Kangla-Sa, at the citadel of the Kangla Palace in Imphal, there is a related type of creature represented with a short body. The sculptures are large and were built of brick, standing at each side of the northern gate. They have a similar head and four sturdy legs, but their body is shorter and bears more of a resemblance to a lion.

In 1891, during the Anglo-Manipur War five British officers were executed by Manipuri soldiers below these two Kangla-Sa. The act was a kind of magic ritual in which the blood of the white officers was seen as feeding there in order to weaken British power. For this act Major Maxwell, the Political Agent that was appointed after the war, had  destroyed the two kangla-sa with gunpowder following the conquest of Manipur.

See also
 Lists of deities in Sanamahism
 Dragons in Manipuri mythology
History of Manipur
Kangla Palace
Ningthouja dynasty

References

External links 

Paphal: the mythical assumptions of Lord Pakhangba, ruling deity of Manipur

Abundance deities
Abundance gods
Animal deities
Animal gods
Arts deities
Arts gods
Crafts deities
Crafts gods
Creator deities
Creator gods
Culture of Manipur
Dragons
Earth deities
Earth gods
Fortune deities
Fortune gods
Health deities
Health gods
Horned deities
Horned gods
Kings in Meitei mythology
Life-death-rebirth deities
Life-death-rebirth gods
Lunar deities
Lunar gods
Magic deities
Magic gods
Maintenance deities
Maintenance gods
Meitei dragons
Meitei deities
Mythological hybrids
Names of God in Sanamahism
Nature deities
Nature gods
Ningthou
Pakhangba
Peace deities
Peace gods
Savior deities
Savior gods
Sky and weather deities
Sky and weather gods
Solar deities
Solar gods
Time and fate deities
Time and fate gods
Tutelary deities
Tutelary gods